Yusuf Nagar a village in Salarpur block, Budaun district of Uttar Pradesh, India. Yusuf Nagar village is also a gram panchayat. It is located 20 km away from Budaun, which is a district, as well as sub-district, headquarter of Yusuf Nagar village.

Demographics
The total population of Yusuf Nagar is 2,637 of which 1,422 are males while 1,215 are females as per Population Census 2011.

See also
 List of villages in India
 Budaun district

References

Villages in Budaun district